Ottavio Profeta (October 10, 1890 – November 23, 1963) was an Italian poet.

Biography
Ottavio Profeta was born in Aidone, Italy on October 10, 1890, to Franco and Adele Piazza. After earning a university degree in law and a short public job in Catania, Sicily, he befriended Giovanni Verga, Luigi Capuana and Luigi Pirandello, and followed their lead in artistically representing the fall of romantic illusions, with a focus on "losers", the poor, and the middle-class, which he viewed as trapped between desperation and disillusionment. He died in Mascalucia in 1963.

Published works
 L'amante dell'amore
 Nascere
 Odia il prossimo tuo
 Sicilia Favola vera

1890 births
1963 deaths
People from Aidone
Italian male poets
Poets from Sicily
20th-century Italian poets
20th-century Italian male writers